Derinkuyu ("deep well") (Cappadocian Greek: Μαλακοπή; Latin: Malakopí) is a town and district of Nevşehir Province in the Central Anatolia region of Turkey. According to 2010 census, population of the district is 22,114 of which 10,679 live in the town of Derinkuyu.

Located in Cappadocia, Derinkuyu is notable for its large multi-level underground city, which is a major tourist attraction. The historical region of Cappadocia, where Derinkuyu is situated, contains several historical underground cities, carved out of a unique geological formation. They are not generally occupied. Over 200 underground cities at least two levels deep have been discovered in the area between Kayseri and Nevşehir, with around 40 of those having at least three levels. The troglodyte cities at Derinkuyu and Kaymaklı are two of the best examples of underground dwellings.

History 

The oldest written source about underground structures is the writings of Xenophon. In his Anabasis he writes that the people living in Anatolia had excavated their houses underground, living well in accommodations large enough for the family, domestic animals, and supplies of stored food. The first two floors of the Derinkuyu Underground City have been dated to this early period.

From Byzantine times (4th century CE) through 1923 Derinkuyu was known by its Cappadocian Greek inhabitants as Malakopea. The underground city was greatly expanded in the middle Byzantine period to serve as a refuge from the raids of the Umayyad Arab and Abbasid armies, during the Arab–Byzantine wars (780-1180). The city contained food stores, kitchens, stalls, churches, wine and oil presses, ventilation shafts, wells, and a religious school. The Derinkuyu underground city has at least eight levels and depth of 85 m and could have sheltered thousands of people. The city continued to be used as protection from the Mongolian incursions of Timur in the 14th century. After the region fell to the Ottomans the cities were used as refuges (Greek: καταφύγια). As late as the 20th century the town's inhabitants, called Cappadocian Greeks, were still using the underground chambers to escape periodic waves of Ottoman persecution. (The Cambridge linguist Dawkins, who spent time in the towns from 1910–1911 while writing his book on Cappadocian Greek wrote, "their use as places of refuge in time of danger is indicated by their name καταφύγια. In 1909, when the news came of the recent massacres at Adana, a great part of the population at Axo took refuge in these underground chambers, and for some nights did not venture to sleep above ground. When the Cappadocian Greeks were required to leave in 1923 in the population exchange between Greece and Turkey, the tunnels were finally abandoned.

Images

See also 
 Avanos
 Churches of Göreme, Turkey
 Eskigümüş Monastery
 Ihlara Valley
 Mokissos
 Özkonak Underground City
 Zelve Monastery

Notes

References

External links 

 District governor's official website 
 District municipality's official website 

Towns in Turkey
Cappadocia
Populated places in Nevşehir Province
Districts of Nevşehir Province